Henry Fok Stadium (Simplified Chinese: 英东体育场) is a multi-purpose stadium in Panyu, China.  It is currently used mostly for football matches and was one of the six stadiums used for the 1991 FIFA Women's World Cup.  The stadium has a capacity of 15,000 people.

It is named after Henry Fok Ying Tung, a businessman who left a large amount of money for this constructions.

Footnotes

Football venues in China
1991 FIFA Women's World Cup stadiums
Venues of the 2010 Asian Games
Multi-purpose stadiums in China
Sports venues in Guangdong